Winterline or winter line is the term used to describe the false horizon that is formed at dusk and is visible from certain mountainous parts of the world. The reason for its formation is not clear, but it has been reported that "experts" believe it occurs due to refraction of light when the dust particles, moisture, and smog, rising from the plains below, meet the cooler mountain air, and a 'second horizon' is formed. It is visible from many places throughout the Himalayas and is very prominent from Mizoram, and Mussoorie in India between October and February, and the local Mussoorie Winterline Carnival is named after the phenomenon. Apart from India, winterline occurs in the Swiss Alps.

Gallery

References

Geography of Uttarakhand
Meteorological phenomena
Atmospheric thermodynamics
Atmospheric circulation
Mussoorie
Geography of Dehradun